The 1993–94 Czech 2. Liga was the inaugural season of the 2. česká fotbalová liga, the second tier of the Czech football league following the dissolution of Czechoslovakia. The league was played with 16 teams, although the following season the number was increased to 18 teams, so only one team was relegated at the end of the season, with three teams being promoted from the third tier. Two points were awarded for a win this season, although from the following season this was changed to three points for a win.

Team changes
Of the 16 teams who had competed at the second level of competition the previous season, the top six teams were promoted to the top flight as replacements for the Slovak teams which had left the league. Seventh-placed Jablonec played a two-legged promotion/relegation playoff with Bohemians from the top league, which Bohemians won, resulting in no Czech teams being relegated from the top flight.

The remaining ten teams from the previous season stayed at this level, with no teams being relegated. They were joined by six new teams who had played the previous season in the third tier of football. These were Blšany, Teplice and Turnov, who had finished in the top three positions of the previous season's Bohemian region competition and Frýdek-Místek, Bohumín and LeRK Brno, who had finished in the top three places of the Moravian–Silesian group.

League standings

Top goalscorers

See also 
 1993–94 Czech First League
 1993–94 Czech Cup

References

 Official website 

Czech 2. Liga seasons
Czech
2